The Very Best of Rosanne Cash is the third compilation album by Rosanne Cash. It was released on November 8, 2005 by Columbia Records. The album contains 14 singles that Cash worked with Columbia from 1979 to 1996, along with her 2003 single "September When It Comes" from Rules of Travel; featuring a duet with her father Johnny Cash, and a previously unreleased version of "Never Be You".

Track listing
All tracks composed by Rosanne Cash; except where indicated
"The Wheel" – 4:20 - from The Wheel (1993)
"The Way We Make a Broken Heart" (John Hiatt) 3:54 - from King's Record Shop (1987)
"Seven Year Ache" – 3:16 - from Seven Year Ache (1981)
"Hold On" – 3:38 - from Rhythm & Romance (1985)
"On the Surface" (Rosanne Cash, Jimmy Tittle) – 2:57 - from Interiors (1990)
"No Memories Hangin' Round" (Rodney Crowell) – 3:26 - from Right or Wrong (1980)
"My Baby Thinks He's a Train" (Preston) – 3:14
"I Don't Know Why You Don't Want Me" (Rosanne Cash, Rodney Crowell) – 3:19
"Blue Moon with Heartache" – 4:28
"Western Wall" – 3:02 - from 10 Song Demo (1996)
"Tennessee Flat Top Box" (Johnny Cash) – 3:16
"September When It Comes" (Rosanne Cash, John Leventhal) – 3:41 - from Rules of Travel (2003)
"Sleeping in Paris" – 4:07
"Never Be You" (Tom Petty, Benmont Tench) – 3:38
"What We Really Want" – 3:31
"Seventh Avenue" (Rosanne Cash, John Leventhal) – 5:11

References

2005 greatest hits albums
Rosanne Cash albums
Albums produced by John Leventhal
Columbia Records compilation albums